Stuart Rowland Robert (born 11 December 1970) is an Australian Liberal Party politician who served as Minister for Employment, Workforce, Skills, Small and Family Business from 2021 to 2022, following his appointment as Minister for Government Services and Minister for the National Disability Insurance Scheme in 2019. He was also appointed Acting Minister for Education and Youth in December 2021 and is a Member of Parliament (MP) for Fadden, since 2007.

Robert served in the Abbott Ministry as the Assistant Minister for Defence from 18 September 2013 until 21 September 2015. Following a leadership spill in the preceding week, new Prime Minister Malcolm Turnbull appointed Robert to the roles of Minister for Veterans' Affairs, Minister for Human Services and Minister Assisting the Prime Minister for the Centenary of ANZAC. Following an investigation into a possible conflict of interest, Robert announced his resignation from the Ministry on 12 February 2016.

In August 2018, Peter Dutton unsuccessfully challenged Malcolm Turnbull for the leadership of the Liberal Party. Leadership tension continued to build, and the party voted to hold a second ballot on 24 August, with Turnbull choosing not to stand. During this time Robert is widely reported to have worked to support for the candidacy of Scott Morrison for the leadership of the Liberal party. Robert was later appointed as Assistant Treasurer in the first Morrison Ministry.

Robert is regarded as one of former Prime Minister Morrison's closest confidants. He also sat on a number of Cabinet committees.

Background and early years
Robert was born in Victoria and spent his early years growing up on a sugar cane farm in Bundaberg, Queensland. He was educated at Rockhampton Grammar School where he secured a scholarship to the Australian Defence Force Academy as an Army Officer Cadet at the age of 17. Following the Academy, Robert attended the Royal Military College Duntroon.

He completed a Masters in Business Administration at Central Queensland University, a Masters in Information Technology at the Queensland University of Technology and graduated from the University of New South Wales with a Bachelor of Arts with Honours.

Early career

Military career
Robert's professional career began in the military where he served for twelve years in units including the 3rd Battalion, The Royal Australian Regiment and the 51st Battalion, The Far North Queensland Regiment. It was also during this time that Robert completed his master's degrees, mostly part-time.

The majority of Robert's military career was spent working within military intelligence and security, and he worked his way to the rank of captain. That included a four-month tour of duty with the peace monitoring force in Bougainville following the civil war.

Business career
After leaving the army in 1999, Robert founded the IT services firm GMT Recruitment, with colleague Andrew Chantler. GMT Recruitment subsequently grew to be a nationwide company and was named a Business Review Weekly "Fast 100" award winner in 2006. The list, which recognised the fastest-growing 100 companies in Australia, again featured GMT Recruitment in both 2007 and 2008.

Political career
In 1991, Robert joined the Liberal Party. As he later explained to parliament, "I was motivated to action as I witnessed the diabolical consequences of the recession which, apparently, 'we had to have', the crippling interest rates and the very high level of industrial disputes which so adversely impacted on my family and many surrounding families. Through all of this turbulence, the urgency to ensure that this place [was] governed for all Australia and not just for sectional interests became self-evident." In 2007 Robert was elected to the House of Representatives representing the seat of Fadden. Two years later, on 8 December 2009, he was appointed Shadow Parliamentary Secretary for Defence. On 14 September 2010 he was promoted to Shadow Minister for Defence Science, Technology and Personnel.

After the 2013 federal election Robert was appointed the Assistant Minister for Defence in the Abbott Government. After the change of prime minister in September 2015, he was appointed Minister for Veterans' Affairs, Minister for Human Services and Minister Assisting the Prime Minister for the Centenary of ANZAC with effect from 21 September 2015.

Following his support for Scott Morrison’s successful bid to become Prime Minister in August 2018 Robert was appointed as Assistant Treasurer in the first Morrison Ministry.

Following the Coalition’s re-election in May 2019 Robert was promoted to Cabinet and appointed as Minister for the National Disability Insurance Scheme and Minister for Government Services - two areas identified as key priorities by Prime Minister Morrison for his Government.

In March 2021 Robert was promoted to the role of Minister for Employment, Workforce, Skills, Small and Family Business. He also retained responsibility for whole-of-government technology through the Digital Transformation Agency.

When asked why Robert had been promoted the Prime Minister cited his successful tenure in his previous role.

National Disability Insurance Scheme 
In June 2019, in response to delays and backlogs for children with disability in accessing Early Childhood Early Intervention (ECEI) supports through the NDIS,  Robert directed the National Disability Insurance Agency to provide standardised interim plans to children who have been found eligible for the NDIS, but who are likely to experience a wait time of greater than 50 days.

News coverage in January 2021 noted that "NDIS waiting times have dropped after concerted efforts from the Federal Government and the National Disability Insurance Agency". The report found 85 per cent of NDIS participants rating their planning experience as “very good” or “good”.  A spokesman for the government said the Federal Government had made improving access and planning decision timeframes a priority, and had made “significant improvements since May 2019”.

In February 2021, Robert pressed ahead with introducing legislative amendments to parliament after a court ruled sex services were not excluded under law from being taxpayer funded through the NDIS saying: “NDIS participants can still freely use their own money, whether that is through government support or earned income, to spend on whatever they want. All we are saying is taxpayer NDIS funds were never intended to be used in this way and we’ll be ensuring this does not happen again.”

Government Services

Services Australia 
At the outset of his role as Minister for Government Services Robert oversaw the establishment of Services Australia. In July 2019 he appointed Martin Hoffman to lead a taskforce to develop a strategic plan to deliver the reform to government service delivery.

While announcing the taskforce, Robert said:  “In those important moments when Australians reach out for government services they rightly expect a simple and seamless interaction. Services Australia will be outcomes focused and will put in place the right structure needed to deliver that experience.‘Whether Australians are accessing government services digitally, in person or over the phone, in the future I want Services Australia to deliver a similar experience to what Australians are used to when dealing with everyday services, such as banking and shopping"Robert appointed Rebecca Skinner as CEO of Services Australia in March 2020.

Support for Black Summer Bushfires 
Services Australia staff deployed as part of the emergency response to the 2019-20 Black Summer Bushfires. Robert told Parliament that Services Australia had provided support deploying more than 20 mobile support teams into dozens of hard-to-reach communities, and delivered millions of dollars via thousands of disaster payments to fire-affected residents. He noted Services Australia also successfully trialed facial verification technology to provide support to those who had lost identity documents.

Government Services Response to COVID-19 Pandemic 
As Minister for Government Services, Robert led Services Australia’s response to the COVID-19 pandemic.

In March 2020 the National Cabinet closed large sections of the Australian economy driving a high demand for social supports and saw thousands of people queue outside Centrelink offices to apply for government payments. 

Following a surge of 12,000 staff drawn from across the Australian Public Service and service partners Services Australia processed as many JobSeeker claims within roughly 50 days as it normally would in two years. Thanks to help from staff from across the Australian Public Service, the agency has granted financial assistance to over 800,000 Australians who have lost their jobs.

On Sunday 7 February 2021 Robert announced Services Australia would ensure Australians would be able to tap and display COVID-19 “proof of vaccination” certificates on their phones or carry hard copies with them.

Future of Government Services 
In December 2020 Robert announced a refurbished Services Australia Service Centre in Western Australia would be used to trial a “new era” of government service delivery. The Perth City Service Centre would offer a new “welcoming environment” that has been designed specifically to help older Australians who need additional support. Robert said the new centre would offer upgraded self-service facilities and digital support, appointment-based services, and specialist services made available through video chat.

Employment, Workforce, Skills, Small and Family Business 
In March 2021 Robert was promoted to the role of Minister for Employment, Workforce, Skills, Small and Family Business. He also retained responsibility for whole-of-government technology through the Digital Transformation Agency.

Previous Policy stances
Robert is a member of the Centre-Right faction of the Liberal Party,and is an advocate of reforming the indexation rules surrounding military superannuation in both the Defence Force Retirements Benefits scheme and the Defence Force Retirement & Death Benefits scheme. He has spoken in Parliament on a number of occasions to argue that  indexation rules should reflect the "unique nature of military service". He has also stated that such service deserves a superannuation scheme with fair indexation that is "indexed in the same way as the age pension and service pensions for those aged 55 and over". He has also criticised Labor and the Australian Greens for their lack of policy in this area.

In 2012, he argued against removing the entitlement from currently serving single members of the Australian Defence Force to a free annual trip home after an effort to scrap it by Labor.

He believes that the realities of war pose different kinds of physical challenges "On a route fitness assessment you may be forced to carry 25 kg"..."But can you carry that weight when you haven't slept for days? Can you carry that weight after parachuting in the rain and landing in the mud?"

He has rejected comparisons from critics who point to countries like Israel, which has women in frontline roles, stating that Israel has regional threats that cannot be translated to Australia. He further said that women in such positions pose a security risk as hostages, stating that male soldiers would react to female soldiers being tortured differently, potentially endangering troops or causing them to reveal state secrets. "The attitude with men [in capture] is just 'Suck it in and welcome to captivity,' but if they watching a woman suffer like that, it's a whole different ball game."

Controversies

China trip and resignation from ministry
On 18 August 2014, Robert attended an event in Beijing, China, at which a mining deal between Australian company Nimrod Resources and Chinese state-controlled corporation China Minmetals was signed. In February 2016, when details of the trip were released, the Opposition called Robert's presence at the signing "inappropriate", because Nimrod chairman Paul Marks was both a friend of his and a substantial donor to the Liberal Party. Robert claimed that the trip was in a "private capacity", and not official government business.

In a subsequent Senate Estimates Committee hearing, officials from the Department of Foreign Affairs and Trade (DFAT) stated that the department had not been informed of the trip until Robert had returned, and that it appeared that Chinese officials at the event were under the impression that Robert was present as an Australian government minister. Prime Minister Turnbull asked his department secretary, Martin Parkinson, to investigate and report on the circumstances of Robert's visit to China to determine if he had breached ministerial standards of conduct.

On 12 February 2016, Robert announced his resignation from the First Turnbull Ministry as part of a broader reshuffle triggered by the resignation of Andrew Robb and Warren Truss.

Robodebt
Robert was criticised for his involvement in establishing the controversial Robodebt scheme during his time as minister for government services. The scheme saw hundreds of thousands of people issued with computer-generated debt notices, some of which made demands for payment from people who did not owe the Government any money, and led to a $1.23 billion refund and compensation settlement in November 2020.

Robert defended Robodebt until in 2020 it was found unlawful by Australian courts, which ordered the government to return $721 million in returned welfare payments.

Crime and Corruption Commission – Operation Belcarra
In March 2017, it was revealed that Robert would appear at a public hearing of the Queensland Crime and Corruption Commission named Operation Belcarra, inquiring into the possibly illegal conduct of candidates in some local government elections. It was alleged that some candidates had formed an undeclared group, and provided an electoral funding and financial disclosure return that was false or misleading. The Crime and Corruption Commission found it would "not be in the public interest" to take any further action.

Possible breaches of Constitution and company law 
In 2017, it was revealed that GMT Group, a company that Robert had founded, had been awarded government contracts worth millions of dollars. This meant that he had been ineligible for election to Parliament under Section 44 of the Constitution of Australia; Robert's situation had similarities to that of Bob Day, who had been disqualified under s. 44. However, because Robert had been re-elected to Parliament after relinquishing his interests in the company, there was no possibility of the previous elections being challenged in the High Court.

It has also been reported that Robert's parents were listed as the directors of his company for six years without their knowledge. Australian Securities and Investments Commission investigated the claims.

Internet usage
In October 2018, Prime Minister Scott Morrison announced that he had asked the Special Minister of State, Alex Hawke, to investigate Robert's internet bills. Concerns were raised about excessive use of taxpayer money to fund his Internet bills
 Although the plan had been approved by the Department of Finance, the Department said that they had warned Robert 'multiple times' about the unusually high costs of his home internet. Robert voluntarily repaid $37,975 of claimed allowance.

Incorrect claims of cyberattack on the MyGov system
In March 2020, during the Australian coronavirus pandemic, the government's digital welfare platform, MyGov, experienced an outage as thousands of people were logging on to register for welfare services. Robert claimed in a press conference that it was not due to the large number of people who are unemployed and trying to log into MyGov to register for Centrelink, but was due to a DDoS attack. “MyGov has not been offline, it’s simply suffered from a distributed denial of service attack this morning,” he said. Later he corrected the claim following further advice, with commentators incredulous that the Minister had said "my bad" during the retraction.

Business connection with Cryo Australia
In October 2018, a newspaper revealed Robert had joined a business selling cryotherapy devices. The business founder, was a convicted rapist who at the time was before Queensland’s highest court on appeal against the conviction. Robert said he did not realise the background of the company’s founder until contacted by the media. Robert resigned his director's position after two and a half weeks. Cryo Australia was liquidated shortly thereafter and Robert reportedly lost a huge sum of money.

Australian Research Council grants vetoed
In the 2021 round, for projects to begin in 2022, the Australian Research Council approved nearly 600 research grants. Robert, as acting education minister, vetoed six grants in the humanities as, in his own view, failing the national interest tests for the grant. He was criticised by academics and politicians for interference with expert evaluation, a delay in making his decision, and announcing it "under cover" of Christmas Eve.

Personal life
Robert has been married since 1996 to his wife Chantelle and has three sons.

References

External links
 - Stuart Robert's political website

1970 births
Living people
Liberal Party of Australia members of the Parliament of Australia
Liberal National Party of Queensland members of the Parliament of Australia
Members of the Australian House of Representatives for Fadden
Members of the Australian House of Representatives
Queensland University of Technology alumni
University of New South Wales alumni
Government ministers of Australia
Australian Army officers
Graduates of the Australian Defence Force Academy
Royal Military College, Duntroon graduates
Abbott Government
Turnbull Government
21st-century Australian politicians
Morrison Government
Australian Pentecostals